A sound alike is a person who is able to use their voice to closely resemble that of another person.

In western culture, sound alikes find work as impersonators on television comedy programmes portraying famous individuals.

See also
 Impressionist (entertainment)
 Look alike
 Mimic

Impressionists (entertainers)